Marina Salas Rodríguez (born October 17, 1988), is a Spanish actress.

Career
Her first onscreen appearance was as the character Laia in El Cor de la Ciutat, a TV series, in 2005. She has also appeared in films, including La Mano Invisible in 2015. Spanish TV actress best known for her appearances in series such as Los Nuestros and Carlos, Rey Emperador.

Personal life
She was born in Barcelona, Spain. Her father worked as a mechanic when she was growing up.

Filmography

Film 
 Sin ti
 Tres metros sobre el cielo
 Tengo ganas de ti
 Por un puñado de besos
 El café de la marina 
 Tres veces tú
 The Cover

Television 
 Desaparecida (2007–2008)
 El barco
 Hay alguien ahí
 Carlos, rey emperador
 Los nuestros (2015)
 Hache

Short film 
 Sexo explícito

Theatre 
 Luces de bohemia

References

External links 

 
 Profile at Instagram

1988 births
Living people
21st-century Spanish actresses
Spanish film actresses
Spanish stage actresses
Spanish television actresses
People from Cornellà de Llobregat
Actresses from Catalonia